Agonum exaratum is a species of beetle in the Platyninae subfamily that can be found in the United States and Russia.

References

Beetles described in 1853
Beetles of North America
exaratum
Taxa named by Carl Gustaf Mannerheim (naturalist)